Rudolf Schlauf (17 March 1910 – August 1952) was an Austrian footballer.

References

External links
 Rapid Archiv

1910 births
1952 deaths
Austrian footballers
Austria international footballers
Association football defenders
SK Rapid Wien players
Wiener Sport-Club players